This is a list of historic houses in the Republic of Ireland which serves as a link page for any stately home or historic house in the Republic of Ireland.

County Carlow

Dunleckney Manor
Lisnavagh House

County Cavan

Bailieborough Castle (demolished)
Bellamont House
Cabra Castle
Castle Saunderson

County Clare

Dromoland Castle
Ennistymon House (now the Falls Hotel)
Moy House

County Cork

Bantry House
Bowen's Court
Clontead More House
Corkbeg House
Doneraile Court
Fota House
Lotamore House
Lotabeg House
Myrtle Grove, Youghal
Red House (Youghal)
Vernon Mount

County Donegal
Ballymacool House
Convoy House
Horn Head House
Mongavlin Castle
Oakfield Demesne

County Dublin
Abbeville House
Aldborough House
Ardgillan Castle
Belcamp Hall
Delville
Drimnagh Castle
Drumcondra House
Glenalbyn
Hillcourt
Howth Castle
Kenure House
Lucan House
Malahide Castle
Manresa House, Dublin
Marino House
Milverton Hall
Newbridge House
Old Connaught House
Rathfarnham Castle
St. Helen's, Booterstown
Tallaght Castle
Turvey House
Tyrone House

County Galway

Ballynahinch Castle (hotel)
Clifden Castle (ruin)
Eyrecourt Castle (ruin)
Lough Cutra Castle
Tyrone House (ruin)

County Kerry

Derreen House
Derryquin Castle (demolished)
Dromquinna House
Dunkerron Castle
Flesk Castle (demolished)
Glanleam House
Kenmare House (demolished)
Killarney House
Muckross House

County Kildare
Balyna House
Ballindoolin House
Barberstown Castle
Carbury Castle
Castletown House
Leixlip Castle
Lyons Demesne
Moore Abbey
Straffan House now the K Club

County Kilkenny
Archers Grove
Archersfield
Ashfield House
Ballatobin House Callan
Ballybur Castle Cuffsgrange
Ballysallagh House
Bessborough House
Birchfield
 Bonnettstown House
Bonnettstown Hall (Castle)
Castleview
Castle Blunden
Castlecomer Demesne
Castletown Cox
Clonmoran
Danesfort House
Danville House
Dama House Ballycallan
Desart Court, near Cuffesgrange and Callan
Drakelands House
Farmley
Floodhall
Foulksrath Castle
Gowran Castle
Grace's Old Castle
Inch House
Jenkinstown Castle
Kilkenny Castle, Kilkenny City
Kilcreene House
Kilferagh House
Maiden Hill or Ardscradaun
Mount Juliet House, near Thomastown
Newpark House
Newtown House, near Kells
Newtown House, Kilkenny
Orchardton
Pococke House
Potterrath House, Kilmanagh
Prospect Park, Foulkstown
Rose Cottage, New Street
Rothe House, Kilkenny City
Rosehill House, Callan Road, Kilkenny City.
Rosemount, College Road, Kilkenny City
Ryland House Cuffsgrange
Shankill Castle
Sheestown House
Shipton House Kilmanagh
Seville Lodge, just outside city, on Callan Road
Swiftsheath
Switzer's Asylum
Webbsborough
Westcourt
Woodstock Estate

County Laois

Abbeyleix House
Emo Court
Heywood House Gardens
Stradbally Hall
Sheffield House, Portlaoise (ruined)

County Leitrim

Glenfarne Hall
Lough Rynn house

County Louth

Ballymascanlon House
Barmeath Castle
Beaulieu House
Drumcar House
Proleek MountPleasent Dundalk
Ghan House
Townley Hall

County Limerick
Adare Manor
Currachase
Kilgobbin House

County Longford
Coolamber Hall House
Doory Hall

County Mayo

Moore Hall, Co. Mayo (ruin)
Rappa Castle (ruin)
Turlough Park House
Westport House

County Meath
Allenstown House (demolished)
Ardbraccan House
Bellinter House
Dangan Castle
Dardistown Castle
Dowth Hall
Derlangan house
Dunsany Castle
Durhamstown Castle
Headfort House
Killeen Castle, Dunsany
Rahinston House
Slane Castle
Summerhill House

County Monaghan
Dartrey House (demolished)
Hope Castle
Rossmore Castle

County Offaly
Birr Castle
Charleville Castle
Kinnitty Castle
Leap Castle

County Roscommon

Clonalis House
Edmonstown House
Kilronan Castle
Scregg House
Strokestown Park

County Sligo
Classiebawn Castle
Hazelwood House
Lissadell House
Markree Castle
Temple House

County Tipperary

Abbeville, Tipperary
Cashel Palace
Castle Otway (ruined)
Cloughjordan House
Marlfield House, Clonmel
Redwood Castle
Slevoir House
Knocklofty

County Waterford

Cappoquin House
Castle Gurteen de la Poer
Curraghmore
Lismore Castle
Mount Congreve
Waterford Castle
Whitfield Court
Woodhouse
 Mayfield Manor

County Westmeath

Ballinlough Castle
Belvedere House and Gardens
Clonyn Castle (or Delvyn Castle)
Gaulstown House
Killua Castle
Middleton Park House
Tullynally Castle

County Wexford

 Bargy Castle
 Borleagh Manor
 Castleboro House
 Courtown House (demolished)
 Johnstown Castle
 Loftus Hall

County Wicklow

Avondale House
Bellevue House
Boystown House
Humewood Castle
Kilruddery House
Luggala Lodge
Powerscourt House
Russborough House
Shelton Abbey

See also
 List of market houses in the Republic of Ireland
 List of historic houses in Northern Ireland

References

External links
Association of Historic House of Ireland (HHI)

Historic houses in Ireland
High-importance Historic houses articles